Tuogu Mosque is a mosque located in Taoyuan Hui Ethnic Township, Ludian County, Yunnan, China.It is a provincial level cultural heritage in Yunnan.

Name
The word Tuogu is transliteration in Yi language. "Tuogu" means a beautiful place.

History
Tuogu Mosque was built by the donation of Qing dynasty military officers Ma Lincan and Ma Linchi in 1730.  It was safe and sound in the 2014 Ludian earthquake.

Architecture
The extant structure is based on the Qing dynasty building principles and retains the traditional architectural style. The extant buildings include the Main Hall, Tower of Huanxing, Hall of Wujuan, Back Pavilion, and Zhaobi.

Main Hall
The hall is supported by 36 columns. Under the eaves is a plaque with Chinese characters "Happy Paradise".

Tower of Huanxing
The Tower of Huanxing is a Chinese tower with five stories. In the center of the eaves of the hall is a plaque, on which there are the words "Puci Wanyou".

References

1730 establishments in China
Mosques completed in 1730
Buildings and structures in Zhaotong
Mosques in Yunnan